The following is a list of Japanese singers in alphabetical order.

A

B

C

D

E

F

G

H

I

J

K

L

M

Mina Myōi

N

O

P

R

S

T

U

V
Valshe
Tomiko Van

W

Y

Z

See also

List of J-pop artists
List of Japanese celebrities
List of Japanese hip hop musicians
List of Japanese idols
List of Japanese people
List of Japanoise artists
List of musical artists from Japan

 
Singers
Japanese